Michael K. Honey (born 1947) is an American historian, Guggenheim Fellow and Haley Professor of Humanities at the University of Washington Tacoma in the United States, where he teaches African-American, civil rights and labor history.

Early life
Honey is a graduate of Northern Illinois University (Ph.D.), Howard University (M.A.) and Oakland University (B.A.).

Career
Honey served as the Harry Bridges Chair of Labor Studies for the University of Washington, and as President of the Labor and Working-Class History Association.

Honey is best known for his scholarly research on the history of the American civil rights activist Martin Luther King Jr., and on the labor history of the United States.  In 2011 he was awarded a Guggenheim Fellowship, "on the basis of his prior achievement and exceptional promise",  from a field of almost 3,000 applicants from the United States and Canada.  He has also received research grants and fellowships from the American Council of Learned Societies, the National Endowment for the Humanities, the National Humanities Center, the Rockefeller Foundation's Bellagio Research and Conference Center, the Huntington Library, and the Stanford Humanities Center.

In 2008 his book Going Down Jericho Road: The Memphis Strike, Martin Luther King's Last Campaign won the Liberty Legacy Foundation Award, awarded annually for the best book written by a professional historian on the fights for civil rights in the United States anytime from 1776 to the present. It also received the Robert F. Kennedy Center for Justice and Human Rights 2011 Book award given annually to a novelist who "most faithfully and forcefully reflects Robert Kennedy's purposes - his concern for the poor and the powerless, his struggle for honest and even-handed justice, his conviction that a decent society must assure all young people a fair chance, and his faith that a free democracy can act to remedy disparities of power and opportunity."

His current work is on the oral history of John Handcox, a Great Depression-era tenant farmer from Arkansas and advocate for the Southern Tenant Farmers Union, known for his political songs and poetry.

Selected works
 Southern Labor and Black Civil Rights: Organizing Memphis Workers (1993) 
 "Black Workers Remember: An Oral History of Segregation, Unionism, and the Freedom Struggle (1999) 
 Going Down Jericho Road: The Memphis Strike, Martin Luther King's Last Campaign, W. W. Norton (2008) 
 All Labor Has Dignity (ed., 2011) , Martin Luther King's speeches on labor rights and economic justice, in the King Legacy Series of Beacon Press
 To the Promised Land: Martin Luther King and the Fight for Economic Justice, W. W. Norton (2018)

References

Archives
 Michael K. Honey Papers. 1935-2001. 8 cubic ft. (8 boxes).

21st-century American historians
21st-century American male writers
Labor historians
Living people
1947 births
Writers from Tacoma, Washington
University of Washington faculty
Northern Illinois University alumni
Howard University alumni
Oakland University alumni
Historians from Washington (state)
American male non-fiction writers
Presidents of the Labor and Working-Class History Association